Events in the year 1997 in Eritrea.

Incumbents 

 President: Isaias Afewerki

Events 

 A revised version of the Constitution of Eritrea was introduced to the National Assembly.

Deaths

References 

 
1990s in Eritrea
Years of the 20th century in Eritrea
Eritrea
Eritrea